The 1948 Texas Tech Red Raiders football team represented Texas Technological College—now known as Texas Tech University—as a member of the Border Conference during the 1948 college football season. Led by eighth-year head coach Dell Morgan, the Red Raiders compiled an overall record of 7–3 with a mark of 5–0 in conference play, winning the Border Conference title for the second consecutive season.

Schedule

References

Texas Tech
Texas Tech Red Raiders football seasons
Border Conference football champion seasons
Texas Tech Red Raiders football